Johann Stephan Decker (Colmar, 1784 - Vienna, 1844) was an Alsatian French painter.

At the age of twenty he went to Paris, where he studied under Jacques-Louis David and Jean-Jacques Karpff, but at the end of seven years he returned to his native city. In 1821 he settled at Vienna, and was much employed at the court in teaching drawing and in the execution of miniatures and water-colour paintings.

He was the father of Georg Decker,

References

Attribution:
 

1784 births
1844 deaths
19th-century French painters
19th-century Austrian painters
19th-century male artists
French male painters
Pupils of Jacques-Louis David
Painters from Alsace
Emigrants from France to the Austrian Empire
People from Colmar
18th-century French male artists